is a district located in Fukuoka Prefecture, Japan.

As of 2003, the district has an estimated population of 36,695 and a density of 195.79 persons per square kilometer. The total area is 187.42 km2.

Towns and villages
Chikujō
Kōge
Yoshitomi

Timeline
1896 Formed by the merger of both Tsuiki and Kōge Districts.
On October 11, 2005 the villages of Shin'yoshitomi and Taihei merged to form the new town of Kōge.
On January 10, 2006 the towns of Shiida and Tsuiki merged to form the new town of Chikujō.

Districts in Fukuoka Prefecture